Ma Lin ( – after 1256) was a Chinese court painter during the Song dynasty active during the early to mid 13th century. He was the son of the famous Chinese painter Ma Yuan, from whom he learned the art of painting.

One of his best known paintings is Night Outing with Candles, which depicts a gentleman sitting in the doorway of a pavilion, facing four pairs of tall candles amongst flowering crab apple trees. It illustrates a poem by the famous (dissident poet and artist) Su Shi: "My fear is that in the depths of night, the flowers will fall asleep and depart, so I light the tall candles to illuminate their red beauty.".  A full moon in the sky overhead confirms its nighttime setting.

Notes

References
 Barnhart, R. M. et al. (1997). Three thousand years of Chinese painting. New Haven, Yale University Press.

External links

Sung and Yuan paintings, an exhibition catalog from The Metropolitan Museum of Art Libraries (fully available online as PDF), which contains material on Ma Lin (see list of paintings)

Year of death unknown
Court painters
Song dynasty landscape painters
Artists from Hangzhou
Year of birth unknown
12th-century Chinese painters
13th-century Chinese painters
Painters from Zhejiang